The 1999 Asian Basketball Confederation Championship for Men was the qualifying tournament for the Basketball Tournament at the 2000 Summer Olympics in Sydney, Australia.

It was played in Fukuoka, Japan.

Qualification

According to the ABC rules, each zone had two places, and the hosts (Japan) and the best 5 teams of the previous Asian Championship were automatically qualified.

Draw

The draw was held on June 15 at New Otani Hotel in Tokyo.

* North Korea and Kazakhstan pulled out of the tournament, leaving Group C with only two teams. ABC added  into the bracket.

Preliminary round

Group A

Group B

Group C

Group D

Quarterfinal round

Group I

Group II

Group III

Group IV

Classification 5th–14th

13th place

11th place

9th place

7th place

5th place

Final round

Semifinals

3rd place

Final

Final standing

Awards

Most Valuable Player:  Hu Weidong
Best 3-Pointer:  Makoto Hasegawa
Sportsmanship Award:  Ali Al-Maghrabi

References

External links
 Results
 archive.fiba.com

ABC
1999
B
B
August 1999 sports events in Asia
September 1999 sports events in Asia
Sports competitions in Fukuoka